Andrey Sakovich (born 15 April 1992) is a Belarusian professional footballer who plays for Bumprom Gomel.

External links
 
 

1992 births
Living people
Belarusian footballers
Association football goalkeepers
FC Gomel players
FC Lida players
FC Belshina Bobruisk players
FC UAS Zhitkovichi players
FC Naftan Novopolotsk players
FC Sputnik Rechitsa players
FC Gorodeya players